Television in the Soviet Union was owned, controlled and censored by the state. The body governing television in the era of the  Soviet Union was the Gosteleradio committee, which was responsible for both the Soviet Central Television and the All-Union Radio.

Soviet television production was classified into central (Soviet Central Television), republican, and regional broadcasting.

History
In 1938, television broadcasting began in Moscow and Leningrad under the auspices of the All-Union Committee for Radiofication and Radio Broadcasting at the USSR Sovnarkom (Всесоюзный комитет по радиофикации и радиовещанию при СНК СССР).

On 1 October 1934, Russia's first television receivers were produced. The B-2 had a 3×4-centimetre (1¼×1½-inch) screen and a mechanical raster scan in 30 lines at 12.5 frames per second. On 15 November 1934, Moscow had its first television broadcast, of a concert. On 15 October 1935, the first broadcast of a film was made.

On 9 March 1938, a first experimental studio television program was broadcast, from Shabolovka tower, in Moscow. Three weeks later, the first full film, The Great Citizen (Великий гражданин), was broadcast. On 7 June 1938, a television broadcast was tried in Leningrad. 

World War II disrupted regular television broadcasting; it was re-instated in Moscow on 15 December 1945. On 4 November 1948, the Moscow television centre began broadcasting in a 625-line standard. On 29 June 1949, the first out-of-studio broadcast, of a football match, was made, from the Dynamo sports stadium. On 24 August 1950, a long-range broadcast was made from Moscow to Ryazan. 

In time for the golden jubilee year of the October Revolution, 1967, SECAM color broadcasts debuted in both Moscow and Leningrad on their local TV channels. By 1973, the Soviet television service had grown into six full national channels, plus republican and regional stations serving all republics and minority communities.

Distance and geography
The size and geography of the Soviet Union made television broadcasting difficult. These factors included mountains, such as the Urals, the Taiga, and the Steppes, and the spanning of eleven time zones. For instance, a program broadcast at 18:00 in Moscow came at 21:00 in Frunze, Kirghizia. The population density was irregular, with many more residents in the west. The Soviet Union also relayed broadcasts to other Warsaw Pact states.

Soviet television standard
The Soviet broadcast television standard used CCIR System D (OIRT VHF band with the "R" channels ranging from R1 to R12) and System K (pan-European/African UHF band), with SECAM as the color system standard. The resulting system is commonly referred to as "SECAM D/K".

Soviet television channels
There were six television channels (called "programmes") in the Soviet Union. "Programme One" was the main channel, with time-slots for regional programming (see "Regional television services", below). The other channels were the All Union Programme (the second channel), the Moscow Programme (the third channel), the Fourth Programme (the fourth channel), the Fifth programme (broadcast from Leningrad), and the Sixth Programme (sports, science, and technology). 

Not all channels were available across all the Soviet Union. Until perestroika and the establishment of the Gorizont satellite network, many regions received just the First Programme and the All Union Programme. The satellite network brought all six channels to the entire Soviet Union. The new channels offered urban news and entertainment (Channel 3); culture, documentaries, and programmes for the Intelligentsia (Channel 4); information and entertainment from the point of view of another city (Channel 5); and scientific and technological content (Channel 6).

Regional television services
In addition to the national television channels, each of the Republics of the Soviet Union (RSS) and Autonomous Soviet Socialist Republics of the Soviet Union (ARSS) had its own state radio and television company or state broadcasting committees. The regional company or committee was able to broadcast regional programming in Russian  or the local language alongside the official First Programme schedule. The regional company or committee was able to broadcast additional channels for their coverage area only. Alongside them were a number of city television stations that served as retransmitters of national programming with local opt-outs for news and current affairs.

Soviet satellite services
The Soviet Union's domestic satellite television system, Orbita, was as large as Canada's Anik  and the United States' satellite system. 

In 1990, there were 90 Orbita satellites, supplying programming to 900 main transmitters and over 4,000 relay stations. The best-known Soviet satellites were the Molniya (or "Lightning") satellites. Other satellite groups were the Gorizont ("Horizon"), Ekran ("Screen"), and Statsionar ("Stationary") satellites. People outside the Soviet Union who used a TVRO satellite television could receive Soviet broadcasts.

Broadcasts were time-shifted for the Soviet Union's many time zones. The national television channels were only on the air for part of the day, giving room in the schedule to time-shift. There were two types of Soviet time-shifting, one based on a similar radio programme, and "Double" programs, which was composite time-shifting for the different time zones.

Only the First Programme was time-shifted on the pattern of a similar radio programme, the All-Union First Programme from Soviet radio. TV Orbita-1 was broadcast in the UTC +11, +12, and +13 time zones. TV Orbita-2 was broadcast in the UTC +9 and +10 time zones; TV Orbita-3 in the UTC +7 and +8 time zones; TV Orbita-4 in UTC +5 and +6; and the First Programme in time zones UTC +2, +3, and +4.

All other national television channels (the All-Union, Moscow, Fourth, and Leningrad programmes) used the "double" programme composite time-shifting.

Programming
Soviet TV programming was diverse. It was similar to that of American PBS. It included news programmes, educational programmes, documentaries, occasional movies, and children's programmes. Major sports events such as soccer and ice hockey matches were often broadcast live. Programming was domestic or made in Warsaw Pact countries.

The broadcasts had relatively high levels of self-censorship. Prohibited topics included criticism against the status and implementation of Soviet ideology, all aspects of erotica, nudity, graphic portrayal of violence and coarse language and illicit drug use.

The leading news programmes used presenters with exemplary diction and excellent knowledge of the Russian language. Sergey Georgyevich Lapin, chairman of the USSR State Committee for Television and Radio (1970 to 1985) made a number of rules. Male presenters could not have beards and had to wear a tie and jacket. Women were not allowed to wear pants. Lapin banned a broadcast of a close up of Alla Pugacheva singing into the microphone, as he considered it reminiscent of oral sex. Lapin and his committee were accused of anti-semitism in the television programming.

Despite these limitations, television grew in popularity. The average daily volume of broadcasting grew from 1673 hours in 1971 to 3,700 hours in 1985. A new television and radio complex, the "PTRC" was built for the 1980 Moscow Olympics. The Ostankino Technical Center in Moscow was one of the largest in the world at that time. 

In the late 1980s, the nature of programming began to change. Some Western programs, mostly from the United Kingdom and Latin America, were imported. Talk shows and game shows were introduced, often copied from their western counterparts. For example, the game show, Pole Chudes (The Field of Miracles) based on Wheel of Fortune. Free speech regulations were gradually eased.

Until the late 1980s, Soviet television had no advertisements. Even then, they were rare, because few companies could produce advertisements about themselves. 

The Soviet Union's television news was provided by the Telegraph Agency of the Soviet Union (TASS).

Made-for-TV movies
At the beginning of the 1960s, television in the USSR expanded rapidly. The increase in the number of channels and the duration of daily broadcasts created a shortage of suitable content. This led to production of television films, in particular of multiple-episode television films (Russian: многосерийный телевизионный фильм)—the official Soviet moniker for miniseries. Despite that the Soviet Union started broadcasting in color in 1967, color TV sets did not become widespread until the end of the 1980s. This justified shooting made-for-TV movies on black-and-white film.

The 1965 four-episode Calling for fire, danger close is considered the first Soviet miniseries. It is a period drama set in the Second World War that depicts Soviet guerrilla fighters infiltrating German compound and directing the fire of the regular Soviet Army to destroy the German airfield. During the 1970s, the straightforward fervor gave way to a more nuanced interplay of patriotism, family and everyday life wrapped into traditional genres of crime drama, spy show or thriller. One of the most popular Soviet miniseries—Seventeen Moments of Spring about a Soviet spy operating in Nazi Germany—was shot in 1972. This 12-episode miniseries incorporated features of political thriller and docudrama and included excerpts from period newsreels. Originally produced in black-and-white in 4:3 aspect ratio, it was colorized and re-formatted for wide-screen TVs in 2009.

Other popular miniseries of the Soviet era include The Shadows Disappear at Noon (1971, 7 episodes) about the fate of several generations of locals from a Siberian village, The Meeting Place Cannot Be Changed (1979, 5 episodes) about the fight against criminals in the immediate post-war period, and TASS Is Authorized to Declare... (1984, 10 episodes) about the tug-of-war of Soviet and American intelligence agencies.

Numerous miniseries were produced for children in the 1970s-1980s. Among them are: The Adventures of Buratino (1976, 2 episodes)—an adaptation of The Golden Key, or the Adventures of Buratino by Alexey Tolstoy, which in turn is a retelling of The Adventures of Pinocchio by Carlo Collodi; The Two Captains (1976, 6 episodes)—an adaptation of The Two Captains by Veniamin Kaverin about a search for a lost Arctic expedition and the discovery of Severnaya Zemlya; The Adventures of Elektronic (1979, 3 episodes) about a humanoid robot meeting and befriending his prototype—a 6th grade schoolboy; Guest from the Future (1985, 5 episodes) about a boy and a girl travelling in time and fighting intergalactic criminals. In each of these, CTV-USSR co-produced them with the Gorky Film Studio.

See also
 Censorship in the Soviet Union
 Propaganda in the Soviet Union
 Soviet Central Television
 Media of the Soviet Union

References

 1990 edition of the WRTH (World Radio and Television Handbook)

External links
 CCCP TV: the Soviet TV portal
  Library of Congress—The U.S. Naval Academy Collection of Soviet & Russian TV
  Russian Museum of Radio and TV website
 The U.S. Naval Academy Collection of Soviet & Russian TV
 Nu Pogodi, the Soviet equivalent of Road Runner/Coyote, or Tom and Jerry.

 
Eastern Bloc mass media